Kinabalu Tower, also known as Sabah State Administrative Centre is a 33-storey, 132-meter-tall, government office complex building in Kota Kinabalu, Sabah, Malaysia. It is Kota Kinabalu and Borneo's second tallest building. 

The complex consists of a single 33-storey office tower and two 9-storey office buildings and house the state's chief minister's office and other state government cabinet members. The construction commenced in August 2011 and was scheduled to complete in 30 months.

Today, the 33-storey office tower is the second tallest building in Borneo just after the Jesselton Twin Towers, which is in the same city.

See also
List of tallest buildings in Kota Kinabalu
Tun Mustapha Tower
Wisma Innoprise
Jesselton Twin Towers

Gallery

References

Buildings and structures in Kota Kinabalu